Robaloscion wieneri is a species of fish in the family Sciaenidae.It is the only member of its genus. This species is native to Southeast Pacific.

References

Sciaenidae
Fish described in 1883